Andy Kohlberg (born August 17, 1959) is an American former professional tennis player who serves as president of Spanish football club Mallorca.

Kohlberg enjoyed most of his tennis success while playing doubles.  During his career he won 1 doubles title.  He achieved a career-high doubles ranking of World No. 26 on March 7, 1988.

Kohlberg, with long-term business partner, Robert Sarver, is vice chairman, co-owner of Phoenix, Arizona NBA franchise Phoenix Suns.

Kohlberg, Robert Sarver, and Steve Nash co-own the Spanish Football First Division club Mallorca.

Career finals

Doubles (1 win, 3 losses)

References

External links
 
 

American male tennis players
Sportspeople from New York City
Tennis people from New York (state)
Pan American Games medalists in tennis
1959 births
Living people
Pan American Games gold medalists for the United States
Tennis players at the 1979 Pan American Games